Mark Vahradian is an Armenian-American film producer.

Filmography

References

American film producers